Pablo Nassar Bolaños (born 28 January 1977 in Alajuela) is a Costa Rican former professional football player.

Club career
Nassar came through the youth ranks at Alajuelense and won two league titles with the club. He also had spells on loan at Universidad and Pérez Zeledón.

In November 2009, Alajuelense reported Nassar retired from playing football and joined the club's backroom staff. It emerged injury cut short his career.

International career
Nassar played at the 1997 FIFA World Youth Championship in Malaysia.

References

External links
 Profile at Nacion 

1977 births
Living people
People from Alajuela
Association football defenders
Costa Rican footballers
C.F. Universidad de Costa Rica footballers
L.D. Alajuelense footballers
Municipal Pérez Zeledón footballers
Liga FPD players